Nam Yoon-su (born July 14, 1997) is a South Korean actor and model. He has appeared in Netflix's original drama series Extracurricular (2020), tvN's Birthcare Center (2020), JTBC's Beyond Evil (2021), and KBS's The King's Affection (2021).

Career 
Nam made his debut as a model in 2014, and made his acting debut through music videos in 2014 and 2015.

In 2018, Nam made his official acting debut through MBC Every 1 drama 4 Kinds of House, and in the same year he appeared in the web drama Want More 19.

In 2019, Nam made a special appearance in the web drama Re-Feel, and participated in the web drama I'm Not A Robot.

In 2020, Nam appeared in the web drama The Temperature Of Language: Our Nineteen. Later, Nam appeared in the Netflix series Extracurricular, which led him to gain in recognition, and he was nominated for the Best New Actor – Television in the 57th Baeksang Arts Awards through the series. Nam then appeared in the short film Live Your Strength  with Bae Suzy and later appeared in tvN drama Birthcare Center.

In 2021, Nam has joined Mnet's M Countdown as a host, with (G)I-DLE's Miyeon. Nam then joined the drama Beyond Evil which premiered in February on JTBC. Nam was also cast in KBS2 drama The King's Affection which premiered in October.

In 2022, Nam appeared in the SBS drama Today's Webtoon alongside Kim Se-jeong and Choi Daniel, which premiered in July.

Filmography

Film

Television series

Web series

Television shows

Music videos

Awards and nominations

References

External links 
 
 
 

1997 births
Living people
South Korean male models
South Korean male television actors
South Korean television presenters
South Korean male web series actors
21st-century South Korean male actors
People from Namyangju
Hanlim Multi Art School alumni